Iran competed at the 1972 Summer Olympics in Munich, West Germany. Iran sent a delegation of 50 competitors, all men, who participated in 33 events in 7 sports. Two competitors in the football tournament did not take part in any matches.

Competitors

Medal summary

Medal table

Medalists

Results by event

Athletics 

Men

Boxing 

Men

Cycling

Road 

Men

Track 

Men

Fencing 

Men

Football 

Men

Weightlifting 

Men

Wrestling 

Men's freestyle

Men's Greco-Roman

References

External links
National Olympic Committee of Iran - 1972 Summer Olympics Results for Iran

Nations at the 1972 Summer Olympics
1972 Summer Olympics
Summer Olympics
Pahlavi Iran